Ershad is the transliteration of an Arabic given name meaning "universal guidance". Ershad also means "recite" in Urdu language.

People 
Hussain Muhammad Ershad (1930–2019), President of Bangladesh during 1983-1990.
Ershad Sikder (died 2004), Bangladeshi criminal.
Ershad Yousefi (born 1981), Iranian football goalkeeper.

Places
Hosseiniye Ershad is a public library and venue in Tehran.
Ershad Pass, a mountain pass in Hindukush mountain range

Others
Ministry of Culture and Islamic Guidance (Iran), also known as Ershad, is a censoring agency of the Iranian government